Since the 1830s, when Chicago enjoyed a brief period of importance as a local milling center for spring wheat, the city has long been a center for the conversion of raw farm products into edible goods. Since the 1880s, Chicago has also been home to firms in other areas of the food processing industry, including cereals, baked goods, and candy.

In the twenty-first century, companies such as The Kraft Heinz Company, Wrigley, Sara Lee, and Tootsie Roll Industries, all maintain operations within the Chicago metropolitan area.

Food manufacturers
Below is a list of notable food manufacturers with current or historical ties to Chicago.

A.J. Canfield Company
Armour and Company
Brach's
Budlong Pickle Company
Chicago Bar Co.
Cloverhill Bakery
ConAgra
Cracker Jack
Curtiss Candy Company
Eli's Cheesecake
Ferrara Pan Candy Company
Fortune Brands
Fuhrman and Forster Company
Goose Island Brewery
Jays Foods, Inc.
Keebler Company
Koval Distillery
Kraft Heinz Company
Kronos Foods
M&M/Mars
Mondelēz International
Morton Salt
Nabisco
Oscar Mayer
Parker House Sausage Company
Quaker Oats Company
Sara Lee Corporation
Sweet Baby Ray's
Swift & Company
Tootsie Roll Industries
Tropicana Products
Urban Accents
US Foods
Vanee Foods
Vienna Beef
Wm. Wrigley Jr. Company
World's Finest Chocolate

See also 
 IGA
 List of food companies

References

External links 
 
 

Chicago-related lists
Economy of Chicago
 
 
Chicago